Telstar 402 was a communications satellite owned by AT&T Corporation.

Telstar 402 was successfully launched into space on September 9, 1994, by means of an Ariane-42L vehicle from the Kourou Space Center, French Guiana. It had a launch mass of 3,775 kg. The satellite was lost shortly after launch due to an explosion that occurred in the propulsion system that was caused by leakage of hot gases.

References

External links

 Gunter's Space Page - Telstar 401, 402, 402R
 Nasa NSSDC Entry

Communications satellites in geostationary orbit
Spacecraft launched in 1994
Satellite launch failures